Juniperus pingii is a species of conifer in the family Cupressaceae. Commonly used in bonsai, it can produce  and correct proportional miniature version of the full size tree.
It is native only to China.

References

External links
 

pingii
Near threatened plants
Endemic flora of China
Taxonomy articles created by Polbot